Mountain Home is the sixth album by American singer/songwriter Owen Temple. It was released on April 26, 2011 on El Paisano Records  and on April 22, 2011 on Blue Rose Records in the UK and the European Union. The songs on the album focus on small Texas towns and the eccentrics inhabiting them.

Track listing
All songs (Temple) except where noted
"Mountain Home" – 2:52 
"Desdemona" – 3:07 
"Medicine Man" (Temple, Adam Carroll, Gordy Quist) – 3:50 
"Small Town" – 2:57 
"Danger and Good Times" (Temple, Adam Carroll, Scott Nolan)– 3:35
"Fall in Love Every Night" – 3:25
"Jacksboro Highway" – 3:41 
"Old Sam" (Temple, Adam Carroll)– 3:22
"Prince of Peace" (Leon Russell, Greg Dempsey)– 3:58
"One Day Closer to Rain" – 2:51

Personnel

Musicians
 Owen Temple - Vocals, Acoustic 
 Charlie Sexton - Baritone guitar, bass
 Gabriel Rhodes - Acoustic, Tenor guitar, Banjo, Piano, Dobro
 Rick Richards - Drums, Percussion  
 Brian Standefer - Cello
 Bukka Allen - Piano
 Tommy Spurlock - Pedal steel guitar
 Adam Carroll - Harmonica
 Gordy Quist - Harmony vocals
 Jamie Wilson - Harmony vocals

Production
Produced and Engineered by Gabriel Rhodes
Recorded at Sunbird Studios, Austin, Texas

Releases

References 

Owen Temple albums
2011 albums